Aidan Zammit is a musician from Sliema, Malta. He has lived in Italy since 1985.

Biography

He has worked as a composer, musician and singer with several artists, including Mike Francis, Niccolò Fabi, Andrea Bocelli, Nicola Piovani, Vincenzo Cerami, Claudio Baglioni, Bungaro, Lorenzo Feliciati, Simone Cristicchi, Antonello Venditti, Marco Mengoni, Angelo Branduardi, Il Volo and Vocintransito. He performed in Khartoum with Fabi, in the first pop concert ever to be held by a western artist in Sudan.

At the Festival di Sanremo in 2004 he arranged and conducted the song “Guardastelle”, awarded for the Best Music that year.

In 2009 Zammit joined Goblin (band), a group renowned for its movie soundtracks.

With Mike Francis (musician) and Mario "Mari-One" Puccioni, Zammit has been a member of “Mystic Diversions”, with 6 albums and compositions featured in over 130 compilations published worldwide.

He has performed and written for movie, television and theatre soundtracks, including films by Roberto Benigni and Warner Bros. cartoons.

In 2009 the album "Fly Away - The music of David Foster" was released and features Zammit as keyboardist and backing vocalist on three tracks. The songs feature international artists such as Jay Graydon, John "JR" Robinson, Neil Stubenhaus, Robbie Dupree and Arnold McCuller.

In 2010 he toured as keyboard player with X-Factor winner Marco Mengoni.

In 2012 and 2013 he toured the US and Latin America as pianist and musical director with Il Volo.

In 2013 he toured the US with Goblin (band)

Since 2014 he has toured with Claudio Baglioni and Gianni Morandi on keyboards, guitar and flute.

In 2017 he has toured with Goblin (band) again in Europe and North America.

In 2019 his first solo album "Exposed" was released.

Discography

Solo projects
 2019 - Exposed

Mystic Diversions
 2001 - Crossing the liquid mirror
 2003 - Beneath another sky
 2004 - Colours
 2006 - From the distance
 2007 - Wave a little light
 2010 - Angel Soul
 2015 - Renaissance

Goblin Rebirth
 2015 - Goblin Rebirth - Relapse Records
 2016 - Alive - Black Widow Records

Claudio Baglioni and Gianni Morandi
 2015 - Capitani Coraggiosi

Bungaro
 2003 - Io no (film) soundtrack
 2004 - L'attesa
 2010 - Arte

Niccolò Fabi
 2003 - La Cura del Tempo Tour Live dvd
 2006 - Novo Mesto (album)
 2006 - Evaporare - Live al Music Village
 2006 - Dischi volanti 1996-2006
 2007 - Dentro
 2008 - Live In Sudan

Mike Francis
 2007 - Inspired

Andrea Bocelli
 2001 - The Homecoming

Lorenzo Feliciati
 2004 - Upon my head
 2006 - Live at European Bass Day

Pope John Paul II
 2004 - Never terrorism, never war

Patrizia Laquidara
 2004 - Indirizzo portoghese

Manuela Zanier
 2008 - Esercizi di stile

Sei Suoi Ex
 1992 - Fino a dove inizia il mare
 1992 - Paola non è un uomo
 1993 - Cuccu bare

Roberto Kunstler
 2005 - Kunstler

Funky Company
 1997 - Everytime

Film Scores

Aidan Zammit
 2006 - La voce di Pasolini

Music written with Bungaro
 2002 - Bbobbolone
 2005 - Compito in Classe
 2006 - Con la Mano di Dio
 2008 - La Canarina Assassinata

Performing with Nicola Piovani
 2002 - Das Sams
 2002 - Pinocchio
 2002 - Nowhere
 2002 - Resurrezione
 2002 - Il nostro matrimonio è in crisi
 2003 - Gli Indesiderabili
 2004 - Luisa Sanfelice
 2004 - Maigret
 2004 - L'équipier
 2005 - The Tiger and the Snow
 2005 - Matilde
 2006 - Fauteuils d'orchestre
 2006 - Räuber Hotzenplotz
 2006 - Fascisti su marte

Performing with Pasquale Filastò
 1996 - La bruttina stagionata
 1997 - Figurine
 2000 - Roberto Rossellini: Frammenti e battute
 2006 - L'impresario delle Smirne
 2007 - Hermano

Theatre Soundtracks

Aidan Zammit and Vincenzo Cerami
 2005 - Vincenzo Cerami legge L'Ecclesiaste
 2007 - Le mille e una notte
 2008 - Viaggio nel Silenzio

Television Soundtracks

Aidan Zammit and Monica Ward
 2002 - Baby Looney Tunes
 2002 - Baby Looney Tunes - una straordinaria avventura
 2003 - Le avventure di Pollicino e Pollicina
 2003 - Grandma Got Run Over By A Reindeer
 2004 - Gnomo Superstar - Le superchicche
 2005 - Baby Looney Tunes

Others
 2005 - Kong - Re di Atlantis

References

External links
Official Website
 Facebook Official Page

1965 births
Living people
Maltese composers
Italian people of Maltese descent
Italian electronic musicians
Italian keyboardists
Maltese pianists
Italian film score composers
Italian male film score composers
Italian record producers
Italian music arrangers
Maltese songwriters
People from Sliema